Christian Rudder (born September 1, 1975) is an American entrepreneur, writer, and musician.

Education
Rudder graduated from Little Rock Central High School in 1993. He attended Harvard University, graduating with a degree in mathematics in 1998.

SparkNotes
Rudder joined SparkNotes in October 1999, a few months after its founding. Rudder was the creative voice of TheSpark.com, which was the viral content arm of SparkNotes during the site's early rise to popularity. He became TheSpark's creative director in March 2001. Soon after the site's sale to Barnes & Noble, Rudder and the SparkNotes founders (Chris Coyne, Sam Yagan, and Max Krohn) left and began working on OkCupid, a dating site. OkCupid launched in February 2004.

OkCupid
Rudder was a co-founder of OkCupid. In the years immediately following the site's creation, he worked on the front-end product and developed the site's editorial voice. From 2009 - 2011, OkCupid published statistical observations and analysis of members' preferences and connections; the blog posts were written by Rudder and gained widespread media attention. In February 2011, OkCupid was sold to IAC, the owner of Match.com and other dating properties, for $90 million. After the sale to IAC, Rudder assumed day-to-day control of OkCupid as President and General Manager until he left in 2015.

Dataclysm
Rudder expanded his writings for OkCupid into the non-fiction book Dataclysm, which became a New York Times Best Seller in September 2014 and was a finalist for the Los Angeles Times Book Prize that year, in the Science & Technology category.

Bishop Allen
He played guitar in indie band Bishop Allen and, with Justin Rice, co-wrote the band's songs. On Bishop Allen's first three albums, Rudder played most of the instruments except drums and piano. Through Bishop Allen, Rudder has contributed to the soundtracks of the movies Saved, Sleepwalk with Me, No Strings Attached, Nick and Norah's Infinite Playlist, Bully,  and several other smaller films and commercials.

Film work
He appeared in Andrew Bujalski's film, Funny Ha Ha, as Alex, and appeared as himself in Peter Sollett's film, Nick and Norah's Infinite Playlist.

Personal life
Christian met his wife, Reshma Patel, at a concert in Boston. Patel runs a public relations firm. They live in New York and have a daughter together. They now live in Central America

Bibliography

References

External links
Bishop Allen - Rudder's band.
OkTrends, Rudder's blog on statistics derived from OkCupid's database.

Dataclysm, Rudder's book about big data and social science at Random House

American humorists
Living people
Harvard University alumni
1975 births